Thon Buri railway station formerly known as Bangkok Noi railway station (สถานีรถไฟบางกอกน้อย), is a class 1 railway station and the current terminus of the Thon Buri Branch Line in Bangkok. Near the station is a railway depot that keeps five functional steam locomotives operable for four special occasions. Thon Buri station is the only station in Bangkok that has railway semaphore signals (although unused) still present on the station grounds.

Despite it's name, the station does not related to Thon Buri district, which instead it's located on Bangkok Noi district.

History 
Originally, the station's location was at Bangkok Noi railway station. It opened in 1903 as a terminus for all Southern Line services. The station was the site of the 0 km mark for the Southern Line. During World War II it was bombed by the Allies as it was a Japanese logistical centre. After the war, the station was rebuilt and was named Thon Buri, opening in 1950. Over the years, Thon Buri Station's role as a major terminal faded as most train services moved to terminate at Bangkok railway station, leaving only ordinary and commuter trains to end here.

In 1999, Chuan Leekpai started a project to renovate the Thon Buri Station area, so a temporary railway station (class 4) was built at the present-day location, about 800 metres from the original location. This station was to be called Bangkok Noi Station. The original Thon Buri Station still opened for ticketing, but passengers boarded at the temporary station. Later events were to end this arrangement.

During Thaksin Shinawatra's government, trains continued services to the original Thon Buri Station. Then the land around the original Thon Buri railway station was granted to the Faculty of Medicine Siriraj Hospital. As a result, on 4 October 2003, services to the original Thon Buri Station stopped completely. The station building was given to Mahidol University, and all services were changed to terminate at Bangkok Noi Station. On 1 January 2004, Bangkok Noi railway station was renamed Thon Buri, and the station's class 4 status was upgraded to class 1.

As of 2015, the original Thon Buri railway station building houses the Siriraj Phimukhsthan Museum. The former temporary station is now the station in use. Despite fewer trains on the Southern Line terminating here compared to Bangkok, all distances along the Southern Line still refer to this station as kilometre 0.

Services 
 Ordinary 254/255 Lang Suan–Thon Buri–Lang Suan
 Ordinary 257/258 Thon Buri–Nam Tok–Thon Buri
 Ordinary 259/260 Thon Buri–Nam Tok–Thon Buri
 Ordinary 351/352 Thon Buri–Ratchaburi–Thon Buri
 Commuter 919/920 [1,2,3,4,5] Thon Buri–Salaya–Thon Buri (runs multiple times per day)

See also 
 List of railway stations in Thailand
 Krung Thep Aphiwat Central Terminal
 Bangkok (Hua Lamphong) railway station

References 

 
 
 

Railway stations in Bangkok
Railway stations opened in 1950
1950 establishments in Thailand